Sophie Daull (born 1965) is a French actress and writer. She was born in Belfort and trained at the National Conservatory in Strasbourg. She published her first book Camille, mon Evolée in 2015. This won the best first novel prize from Lire magazine. Her third novel Au Grand Lavoir (2018) won the EU Literature Prize in 2019.

References

21st-century French women writers
21st-century French novelists
French women novelists
Writers from Belfort
Living people
1965 births